Alonso of Spain (22 September 1611 – 16 September 1612) was an infante of Spain, who died in childhood.

Life 
He was born in the Monastery of El Escorial, from the marriage of Philip III of Spain and Margaret of Austria.

He was the last of the eight children of the couple and fourth male. As a consequence of his birth, his mother died few days later. This circumstance earned him the nickname of El Caro (the Dear), for which he was known in his short life as Don Alonso el Caro.

He was baptized in his birthplace where he was born, on the 8th October of that same year on the feast of Saint Francis of Assisi. The baptism was not public and festive, due to the recent death of his mother. His godparents at baptism were his older siblings Anne and Philip, the sacrament being administered by the Patriarch of the West Indies, Diego de Guzmán. He was carried to the baptismal font by his cousin Philip Emmanuel of Savoy, Prince of Piedmont.

The choice of the name Alonso, or Alfonso, was related to the memory of the ancient kings of Castile.

He died before he was one year old and was taken to the monastery of San Lorenzo de El Escorial. His tomb is located in the sixth chamber of the Panteón of Infantes, commonly known as the nursery mausoleum, under the inscription:ALPHONSVS, PHILIPPI III FILIVSHis father Philip III accepted the death of the infant, with resignation, as happened one year before with the death of his own wife Margaret.

Notes

References 

Spanish infantes
Portuguese infantes
House of Habsburg
1611 births
1612 deaths
Burials in the Pantheon of Infantes at El Escorial
Royalty and nobility who died as children